Jeffrey DeMunn (born April 25, 1947) is an American stage, film and television actor known for playing Captain Esteridge in The Hitcher (1986), Sheriff Herb Geller in The Blob (1988), Andrei Chikatilo in Citizen X (1995), Harry Terwilliger in The Green Mile (1999), Ernie Cole in The Majestic (2001), Dan Miller in The Mist (2007), Dale Horvath in The Walking Dead (2010–2012), and Charles Rhoades Sr. in Billions (2016–present).

Early life
DeMunn was born in Buffalo, New York, the son of Violet (née Paulus) and James DeMunn, and a stepson of actress Betty Lutes DeMunn. He graduated from Union College with a Bachelor of Arts in English.

Career

Theater roles
He moved to the United Kingdom in 1970, receiving theatrical training at the Bristol Old Vic Theatre School. When he returned to the United States in 1972, he performed in a Royal Shakespeare Company National Tour's production of King Lear and A Midsummer Night's Dream. After this he starred in several off-Broadway productions, including Bent, Modigliani, and A Midsummer Night's Dream. DeMunn also participated in productions of developing plays at the Eugene O'Neill Theater Center. In 1983 he starred in a production of K2, which earned him a Tony Award nomination. He most recently starred in Death of a Salesman at San Diego's Old Globe Theater in 2012 and A Family For All Occasions at the Bank Street Theatre in 2013.

Film roles
DeMunn is known for his collaborations with director Frank Darabont, who has cast him in films such as The Shawshank Redemption, The Green Mile, The Majestic and The Mist. He also appeared in the 1988 remake of The Blob, which Darabont co-wrote. He also narrated the audiobooks for Dreamcatcher and The Colorado Kid. In 1995, he won a CableACE Award as Best Supporting Actor in a Movie or Miniseries for his portrayal of serial killer Andrei Chikatilo in the HBO film Citizen X and received a Primetime Emmy Award for Outstanding Supporting Actor in a Miniseries or a Movie nomination.

Television roles
DeMunn has made several guest appearances on series television. His extensive TV résumé includes shows such as Kojak, Moonlighting, LA Law and The West Wing. He appeared in the recurring role of Norman Rothenberg in  Law & Order, and Trial by Jury. He appeared in the television miniseries Storm of the Century. He portrayed Dale Horvath in Frank Darabont's television adaptation of the comic book series The Walking Dead, for two seasons from 2010 to 2012. Upon his departure, he was cast as Hal Morrison in the 2013 television series Mob City, which was also created by Darabont.

DeMunn has a starring role on the Showtime series Billions as Chuck Rhoades Sr., wealthy father to Paul Giamatti's Chuck Rhoades Jr.

Personal life
DeMunn married Ann Sekjaer in 1974; they divorced in 1995. He married Kerry Leah in 2001.

Filmography

Film

Television

Stage

Awards and nominations

References

External links
 
 

1947 births
Living people
American male film actors
American male stage actors
American male television actors
Alumni of Bristol Old Vic Theatre School
Drama Desk Award winners
Male actors from Buffalo, New York
Union College (New York) alumni
20th-century American male actors
21st-century American male actors
American male Shakespearean actors